Fort Ross Ventures is an international venture capital firm headquartered in Menlo Park, California. By 2022, it managed 4 funds focused on rounds from Seed to late-stage (Series D+).

History 

Fort Ross Ventures was established in 2013 in Menlo Park by a former Sberbank tech executive, Victor Orlovski. The firm was named after a Northern Californian outpost set up by the Russian explorers in the 19th century. The bank was the firm's important LP in its early funds.

Fort Ross Ventures focused on startups in fintech, edtech, food tech, cloud computing, AI and machine learning, and business automation. Around 60% of its investments goes towards U.S. startups, and the other 40% are spread between the UK, Israel, and Europe.

The sanctions against Sberbank in 2022 raised concerns among other LPs. In response to that, Orlovski stated that the firm will act in compliance with the law, isolate any “toxic” money in the pool, and will leave Sberbank out of the fundraising for its latest fund.

Funds 

By 2022, the firm managed about $500 million in several funds and invested in over 30 mid- and late-stage startups in the U.S., Europe, and Israel. In addition to funding, Fort Ross Ventures provides advisory services and assists its portfolio companies in recruiting engineering talents from Eastern Europe.

 A $110-million fund titled SBT Ventures I was established in 2013 mostly funded by Sberbank. Thanks to the investment in eToro, the fund claimed the IRR (internal rate of return) up to 50%.
 SBT Ventures II $235-million fund had been raised by 2018 with participation of around 40 LPs, including corporations, family offices, and high-net-worth individuals.
 Fort Ross Seed Fund had been raised by 2020 to invest on Seed and Series A rounds.
 By the late 2021 the firm raised $100 million of its $200-million Late-Stage fund with a focus on Series D+ rounds in companies with a potential for IPO or strategic sale within 2 to 3 years and a typical check size between $10 million and $30 million.

Portfolio 

The firm's portfolio includes, but isn't limited to:

 eToro
 Rescale
 Tufin (IPO)
 Uber (IPO)
 Moven
 Roofstock
 Insurify
 Dynamic Yield (acquired by McDonald's)
 CoverWallet (acquired by Aon)

References 

Venture capital firms of the United States